The Bian River, also known in Chinese as the Bian Shui (汴水), was an ancient river partly located within the borders of China's Kaifeng City, Henan Province. 
Tang dynasty (618–907 CE) poet Pi Rixiu wrote about the river in his Treasured memories of the Bian River (汴河怀古)

Rivers of Henan
Former rivers